The Roman Catholic Diocese of Jhansi is a diocese located in the city of Jhansi in the Ecclesiastical province of Agra in India.  Peter Parapullil has been the diocesan bishop since 2012.

History
 12 January 1940: Established as Apostolic Prefecture of Jhansi from the Diocese of Allahabad
 5 July 1954: Promoted as Diocese of Jhansi

Leadership
 Bishops of Jhansi (Latin Rite)
 Peter Parapullil (31 October 2012 - )
 Frederick D'Souza (4 March 1977 – 31 October 2012)
 Baptist Mudartha (29 November 1967 – 1 March 1976)
 Francis Fenech, O.F.M. Cap. (5 July 1954 – 8 May 1967)
 Prefects Apostolic of Jhansi (Latin Rite)
 Francis Fenech, O.F.M. Cap. (became Bishop of Jhansi; 21 January 1946 – 5 July 1954)
 Joseph Angel Poli, O.F.M. Cap. (Bishop of Allahabad 1917–1946 and Apostolic Administrator 1940 – 21 January 1946)

References
 GCatholic.org
 Catholic Hierarchy

Roman Catholic dioceses in India
Christian organizations established in 1940
Roman Catholic dioceses and prelatures established in the 20th century
Christianity in Uttar Pradesh
Jhansi
1940 establishments in India